Peckham Technology Inc is a United States corporation based in the State of Washington that develops and manufactures complex electronics for military, aviation, and consumer applications.


Business
Peckham Technology Inc was founded in 2012 to perform consulting services for complex electronics in support of volume production activities.

Designs
Product designs include the World's Smallest Mode C and Mode S Aviation Transponders with ADS-B In and Out, Dual-Channel ADS-B Receivers with AHRS and integrated GPS and WiFi. Areas of expertise include radio frequency communications, microcontroller and FPGA, sensors and sensing systems, ultra-miniature and low-power designs for space-constrained and power-limited environments.

External links
Corporate Website
Partner Website

References

Electronics companies of the United States